Nancy Sue Wilson (February 20, 1937 – December 13, 2018) was an American singer whose career spanned over five decades, from the mid-1950s until her retirement in the early 2010s. She was especially notable for her single "(You Don't Know) How Glad I Am" and her version of the standard "Guess Who I Saw Today". Wilson recorded more than 70 albums and won three Grammy Awards for her work. During her performing career, Wilson was labeled a singer of blues, jazz, R&B, pop, and soul; a "consummate actress"; and "the complete entertainer". The title she preferred, however, was "song stylist". She received many nicknames including "Sweet Nancy", "The Baby", "Fancy Miss Nancy" and "The Girl With the Honey-Coated Voice".

Early life 
Nancy Wilson was born on February 20, 1937, in Chillicothe, Ohio, to Olden Wilson, an iron foundry worker, and Lillian Ryan. Wilson attended Burnside Heights Elementary School and developed her singing skills by participating in church choirs. She attended West High School in Columbus, Ohio where she won a talent contest and was rewarded with a role as a host for a local television show. She then went on to attend Ohio’s Central State University where she pursued her B.A. degree in education.

Career 

When Wilson met Julian "Cannonball" Adderley, he suggested she move to New York City for career opportunities. In 1959, she moved to New York to try to hire Adderley's manager and get a contract with Capitol Records. Within four weeks of her arrival in New York she got her first big break, a call to fill in for Irene Reid at "The Blue Morocco". The club booked Wilson on a permanent basis; she was singing four nights a week and working as a secretary for the New York Institute of Technology during the day. John Levy sent demos of "Guess Who I Saw Today", "Sometimes I'm Happy", and two other songs to Capitol. Capitol Records signed her in 1960.

Wilson's debut single, "Guess Who I Saw Today", was so successful that between April 1960 and July 1962 Capitol Records released five Nancy Wilson albums. Her first album, Like in Love, displayed her talent in Rhythm and Blues. Adderley suggested that she should steer away from her original pop style and gear her music toward jazz and ballads. In 1962, they collaborated, producing the album Nancy Wilson and Cannonball Adderley, which propelled her to national prominence with the hit R&B song, "Save Your Love For Me", and Wilson would later appear on Adderley's live album In Person (1968). Between March 1964 and June 1965, four of Wilson's albums hit the Top 10 on Billboards Top LPs chart. In 1963, "Tell Me The Truth" became her first truly major hit, leading up to her performance at the Coconut Grove in 1964 – the turning point of her career, garnering critical acclaim from coast to coast. TIME said of her, "She is, all at once, both cool and sweet, both singer and storyteller." In 1964 Wilson released what became her most successful hit on the Billboard Hot 100 with "(You Don't Know) How Glad I Am", which peaked at No. 11. From 1963 to 1971 Wilson logged 11 songs on the Hot 100, including two Christmas singles. However, "Face It Girl, It's Over" was the only remaining non-Christmas song to crack the Top 40 for Wilson (No. 29, in 1968).

After making numerous television guest appearances, Wilson eventually got her own series on NBC, The Nancy Wilson Show (1967–1968), which won an Emmy. Over the years she appeared on many popular television shows from I Spy (more or less playing herself as a Las Vegas singer in the 1966 episode "Lori", and a similar character in the 1973 episode "The Confession" of The F.B.I.), Room 222, Hawaii Five-O, Police Story, The Jack Paar Program, The Sammy Davis Jr. Show (1966), The Danny Kaye Show, The Smothers Brothers Comedy Hour, Kraft Music Hall, The Sinbad Show, The Cosby Show, The Andy Williams Show, The Carol Burnett Show, Soul Food, New York Undercover, and recently Moesha, and The Parkers. She also appeared on The Ed Sullivan Show, The Merv Griffin Show, The Tonight Show, The Arsenio Hall Show and The Flip Wilson Show. She was in the 1993 Robert Townsend's The Meteor Man and in the film, The Big Score. She also appeared on The Lou Rawls Parade of Stars and the March of Dimes Telethon.

She was signed by Capitol Records in the late 1970s and in an attempt to broaden her appeal she cut the album Life, Love and Harmony, an album of soulful, funky dance cuts that included the track "Sunshine", which was to become one of her most sought-after recordings (albeit among supporters of the rare soul scene with whom she would not usually register). In 1977 she recorded the theme song for The Last Dinosaur, a made-for-TV movie which opened in theaters in Japan.
 In the 1980s, she recorded five albums for Japanese labels because she preferred recording live, and American labels frequently did not give her that option. She gained such wide popularity that she was selected as the winner of the annual Tokyo Song Festivals.

In 1982, Wilson recorded with Hank Jones and the Great Jazz Trio. In that same year she recorded with the Griffith Park Band whose members included Chick Corea and Joe Henderson. In 1987 she participated in a PBS show entitled Newport Jazz '87 as the singer of a jazz trio with John Williams and Roy McCurdy. In 1982, she also signed with CBS, her albums here including The Two of Us (1984), duets with Ramsey Lewis produced by Stanley Clarke; Forbidden Lover (1987), including the title-track duet with Carl Anderson; and A Lady with a Song, which became her 52nd album release in 1989. In 1989, Nancy Wilson in Concert played as a television special. In the early 1990s, Wilson recorded an album paying tribute to Johnny Mercer with co-producer Barry Manilow entitled With My Lover Beside Me. In this decade she also recorded two other albums, Love, Nancy and her sixtieth album If I Had My Way. In the late 1990s, she teamed up with MCG Jazz, a youth-education program of the Manchester Craftsmen's Guild, nonprofit, minority-directed, arts and learning organization located in Pittsburgh, Pennsylvania.

In 1995, Wilson performed at the New Orleans Jazz & Heritage Festival and the San Francisco Jazz Festival in 1997. In 1999, she hosted a show in honor of Ella Fitzgerald entitled Forever Ella on the A & E Network. All the proceeds from 2001's A Nancy Wilson Christmas went to support the work of MCG Jazz. Wilson was the host on NPR's Jazz Profiles, from 1996 to 2005. This series profiled the legends and legacy of jazz through music, interviews and commentary. Wilson and the program were the recipients of the George Foster Peabody Award in 2001. Wilson's second and third album with MCG Jazz, R.S.V.P. (Rare Songs, Very Personal) (2005), and Turned to Blue (2007), both won the Grammy Award for Best Jazz Vocal Album. On September 10, 2011, she performed on a public stage for the last time at Ohio University in Athens, Ohio. According to Wilson, "I'm not going to be doing it anymore, and what better place to end it than where I started – in Ohio."

Awards

In 1964, Wilson won her first Grammy Award for the best rhythm and blues recording for the album How Glad I Am. She was featured as a "grand diva" of jazz in a 1992 edition of Essence. In the same year, she also received the Whitney Young Jr. Award from the Urban League. In 1998, she was a recipient of the Playboy Reader Poll Award for best jazz vocalist.

In 1986, she was dubbed the Global Entertainer of the Year by the World Conference of Mayors. She received an award from the Martin Luther King Jr. Center for Nonviolent Social Change in 1993; the NAACP Image Award – Hall of Fame Award in 1998, and was inducted into the Big Band and Jazz Hall of Fame in 1999. She received the Trumpet Award for Outstanding Achievement in 1994. Wilson received a Star on the Hollywood Walk of Fame in 1990, at 6541 Hollywood Blvd. She received honorary degrees from Berklee College of Music in Boston, MA and Central State University in Wilberforce, Ohio. She is also a member of Delta Sigma Theta sorority. Wilson has a street named after her in her hometown of Chillicothe, Ohio. She co-founded the Nancy Wilson Foundation, which exposes inner-city children to the country. Wilson was the recipient of the National Endowment for the Arts (NEA), NEA Jazz Masters Fellowships award in 2004, the highest honors that the United States government bestows upon jazz musicians. In 2005 she received the NAACP Image Awards for Best Recording Jazz Artist. She received the 2005 UNCF Trumpet Award celebrating African-American achievement, a Lifetime Achievement Award from the NAACP in Chicago, and Oprah Winfrey's Legends Award.

In September 2005, Wilson was inducted into the International Civil Rights Walk of Fame at the Martin Luther King Jr. National Historic Site. Wilson was a major figure in Civil Rights Movement. Wilson noted that the ceremony gave her "one of the best ceremonies that I've ever had in my life." Times.com, August 20, 2006: "It's been a long career for the polished Wilson, whose first albums appeared in the 1960s, and she faces that truth head-on in such numbers as 'These Golden Years' and 'I Don't Remember Ever Growing Up'. Shorter breathed these days, she can still summon a warm, rich sound and vividly tell a song's story. With a big band behind her in 'Taking a Chance on Love', she also shows there's plenty of fire in her autumnal mood". At the Hollywood Bowl, August 29, 2007, Wilson celebrated her 70th birthday with an all-star event hosted by Arsenio Hall. Ramsey Lewis and his trio performed "To Know Her Is To Love Her".

Life and death
Wilson and her first husband, drummer Kenny Dennis, were married in 1960. They had a son Kenneth ("Kacy") Dennis Jr., but by 1970, they had divorced. On May 22, 1973, Wilson married Reverend Wiley Burton, a Presbyterian minister. They married within a month of their first meeting. She gave birth to Samantha Burton in 1975, and the couple adopted Sheryl Burton in 1976. As a result of her marriage, she abstained from performing in various venues, such as supper clubs. For the following two decades, she successfully juggled her personal life and her career. In November 1998, both of her parents died; she called this year the most difficult of her life.

In August 2006, Wilson was hospitalized with anemia and potassium deficiency, and was on I.V. sustenance while undergoing a complete battery of tests. She was unable to attend the UNCF Evening of Stars Tribute to Aretha Franklin and had to cancel the engagement. All of her other engagements were on hold pending doctors' reports.

In March 2008, she was hospitalized for lung complications, recovered, and reported to be doing well. In the same year, her husband, Wiley Burton, died after suffering from renal cancer. On December 13, 2018, Wilson died after a long illness at her home in Pioneertown, California. She was 81 years old.

Grammy history
Career wins: 3
Career nominations: 7 (Note: In a 2007 interview, Wilson stated that she had been nominated more than 20 times. However, the Grammy Awards web site lists seven nominations for Wilson.)

Discography 

 Like in Love (1959)
 Something Wonderful (1960)
 The Swingin's Mutual! (with George Shearing) (1961)
 Nancy Wilson/Cannonball Adderley (1962)
 Broadway – My Way (1963)
 Hollywood – My Way (1963)
 Yesterday's Love Songs/Today's Blues (1964)
 Today, Tomorrow, Forever (1964)
 The Nancy Wilson Show! (1965)
 Tender Loving Care (1966)
 Lush Life (1967)
 Welcome to My Love (1967)
 Just For Now (1967)
 Hurt So Bad (1969)
 Can't Take My Eyes Off You/Nancy Wilson (1970)
 But Beautiful (1971)
 I’ve Never Been to Me (1977)
 Life, Love and Harmony (1979)
 A Lady with a Song (1989)
 With My Lover Beside Me (1991)
 Love, Nancy (1994)
 If I Had My Way (1997)
 A Nancy Wilson Christmas (2001)
 R.S.V.P. (Rare Songs, Very Personal)  (2004)
 Turned to Blue (2006)

Filmography

Film

Television
{| class="wikitable sortable"
|-
! Year
! Title
! Role
! class="unsortable" | Notes
|-
|1965
|Burke's Law
|Choo Choo
|Episode: "Who Killed Wimbledon Hastings?"
|-
|1966
|I Spy
|Lori
|Episode: Lori
|-
|1966–1967
|The Red Skelton Show
| Singer/Store Detective/Dr. Cagney
|Episode: "The Bum Who Came in from the Cold" (1966) Episode: "Clothes Make the Bum" (1967)
|-
|rowspan=2|1968
|That's Life
| Lillian Moore
|Episode: "Bachelor Days"Episode: "How We Met"
|-
|The Carol Burnett Show
|Herself
|Guest starring with Lucille Ball and Eddie AlbertGuest starring with Mickey Rooney
|-
|rowspan=2|1970
|Room 222
|Michelle Scott
|Episode: "Play It Loose"
|-
|Hawaii Five-O
|Eadie Jordan
|Episode: "Trouble In Mind"
|-
|1972
|O'Hara, U.S. Treasury
|Poppy Grant
|Episode: "Operation: Rake-Off"
|-
|rowspan=2|1973
|Search
|Sugar Francis
|Episode: "The Mattson Papers"
|-
|The F.B.I.
|Darlene Clark
|Episode: "The Confession"
|-
|1974
|Police Story
|Kelly Craig
|Episode: "World Full of Hurt"
|-
|rowspan=2|1989
|It's a Living
|Ivy Reynolds
|Episode: "The Ginger's Mother Show"
|-
|The Cosby Show
|Lorraine Kendall
|Episode:  Grampy and NuNu Visit the Huxtables"
|-
|1993–1994
|The Sinbad Show
|Louise Bryan
|9 episodes
|-
|1995–1997
|The Parent 'Hood'''
|Dr. Carolyn Plemmer/Elizabeth
|Episode: "The Paw That Rocks the Cradle" (1995)Episode: "Mother and Law" (1997)
|-
|2001
|The Parkers| Aunt Rita
|Episode: "Family Ties and Lies" 
|}

DVD concert films

 Nancy Wilson at Carnegie Hall (2001)
 Great Women Singers of the 20th Century – Nancy Wilson (2005)

5. Ed Sullivan Show  appearance

References

External links

 
 [ Billboard'' Chart History for Nancy Wilson]
 
 NEA Jazz Masters: Nancy Wilson – Biography and Interview
 Nancy Wilson at Find a Grave

1937 births
2018 deaths
20th-century African-American women singers
American women jazz singers
American jazz singers
Grammy Award winners
African-American actresses
African-American jazz musicians
American film actresses
American television actresses
American rhythm and blues singers
Torch singers
Traditional pop music singers
Delta Sigma Theta members
American Presbyterians
People from Chillicothe, Ohio
People from South Los Angeles
Actresses from Ohio
Singers from Ohio
Singers from Los Angeles
Jazz musicians from California
20th-century American actresses
21st-century American actresses
20th-century American singers
21st-century American singers
20th-century American women singers
21st-century American women singers
Ballad musicians
Capitol Records artists
Columbia Records artists
Jazz musicians from Ohio
Musicians from Columbus, Ohio
The Jazztet members
21st-century African-American women singers
Burials at Forest Lawn Cemetery (Cathedral City)